Khass Beg ibn Palang-Eri (also spelled Khassbeg; died April/May 1153) was a Turkmen amir (commander) of the Seljuk sultanate of Iraq, who dominated the sultanate in the 1140s.

According to an expanded version of the Saljuq-nama, Khass Beg grew up with a group of Turkmens who had their summer pastures on Mount Sabalan, in the eastern part of Azerbaijan, and their winter pastures most likely in Mughan or Arran, in the South Caucasus.

Following the death of the Seljuk sultan Ghiyath ad-Din Mas'ud in 1152, Khass conducted the succession in Hamadan, successfully making Malik-Shah III acknowledged as the new sultan. After three months, however, Khass Beg had Malik-Shah III replaced with his brother Muhammad II ibn Mahmud. When Muhammad II reached Hamadan, he had Khass Beg killed by amirs who envied his ascendancy.

References

Sources 
 
 

Year of birth unknown
1153 deaths
Generals of the Seljuk Empire
12th-century Turkic people